Georg Gulyás (born 5 October 1968) is a Swedish classical guitarist.

Biography
Georg Gulyás was born in Säffle, Sweden, and studied at the Musikhögskolan in Malmö and Juilliard School of Music in New York. He has received a guitar diploma from École Normale de Musique in Paris 1997 and Kungliga Musikhögskolan in Stockholm. Among his notable teachers are Göran Söllscher, Alberto Ponce and Sharon Isbin. In 1987, Gulyás received first prize in the "Karis International Guitar Competition". Since then he has been touring in Russia, Japan, USA and South America as well as performing as soloist with several major orchestras such as Royal Stockholm Philharmonic Orchestra.

Gulyás has recorded several CDs featuring music by Alberto Ginastera, Manuel de Falla and Gerardo Matos Rodríguez. The CD "Albèniz, Ponce, Tárrega" was awarded "Best Instrumental Music" at the 2006 Audiophile Recordings Awards in Hong Kong.

In 2011, a CD with guitar music by J.S. Bach was released.

Repertoire (selection)
Recuerdos de la Alhambra – Francisco Tárrega 	
Capricho arabe – Francisco Tárrega
Asturias – Isaac Albéniz
Gyermekeknek – Béla Bartók
Preludium I-V – Heitor Villa-Lobos
Nocturnal Op. 70 – Benjamin Britten
Sonata – Leo Brouwer
El Decamaron Negro – Leo Brouwer
Études Simples – Leo Brouwer

Pieces written specifically for Gulyas
GO – Stefan Pöntinen
Three Japanese Songs – Moto Osada
On Tour – Ylva Skog
Lullabyesque – Gustav Alexandrie
Herd's Lullaby – Miklós Maros
Inas vaggvisa – Mauro Godoy Villalobos
Fancy – Zoltan Gaal
Preludium No. 12 – Johan Hammerth
Kupé (for guitar duo) – Simon Stålspets

References

External links
Officiell webbplats
Swedish Radio (14 April 2011) Sverigesradio

1968 births
Living people
Swedish classical guitarists